The HTC Cavalier (HTC S630) is a smartphone model manufactured by High Tech Computer beginning in 2006.

External links

 Official HTC S620 product description at HTC manufacturer website

Mobile phones introduced in 2007
Windows Mobile Standard devices
Cavalier
Mobile phones with an integrated hardware keyboard

zh:HTC Excalibur